Tebat Karai is a district (kecamatan) of Kepahiang Regency, Bengkulu.

Subdistricts 
 Taba Saling 
 Taba Sating 
 Tertik 
 Talang Karet 
 Tebing Penyamun 
 Peraduan Binjai 
 Penanjung Panjang Atas 
 Penanjung Panjang 
 Taba Air Pauh 
 Nanti Agung 
 Sinar Gunung 
 Karang Tengah 
 Tapak Gedung

Districts of Kepahiang Regency